David Ross Obey (born October 3, 1938) is an American lobbyist and former politician who served as a member of the United States House of Representatives for  from 1969 to 2011. The district includes much of the northwestern portion of the state, including Wausau and Superior. He is a member of the Democratic Party, and served as Chairman of the powerful House Committee on Appropriations from 1994 to 1995 and again from 2007 to 2011. He was the longest-serving member ever of the United States House of Representatives from the state of Wisconsin, until surpassed by Jim Sensenbrenner in 2020.

On May 5, 2010, Obey announced that he would not seek reelection to Congress in November 2010. He left Congress in January 2011, and was succeeded by Republican Sean Duffy. He began working for Gephardt Government Affairs, a lobbying firm founded by former U.S. House Majority Leader Dick Gephardt, in June 2011.

Early life and education
Obey was born in Okmulgee, Oklahoma, the son of Mary Jane (née Chellis) and Orville John Obey. Soon after his birth, his family moved back to his parents' native Wisconsin, and Obey was raised in Wausau, Wisconsin, where he has lived since. He graduated from Wausau East High School and received his Bachelor of Arts degree in political science from and did graduate work in Soviet politics at the University of Wisconsin–Madison.

Early career 
Before serving in Congress, Obey worked as a real estate broker.

Obey grew up as a Republican. However, he was so angered after seeing his teachers falsely branded as Communists by backers of Joseph McCarthy that he became a Democrat in the mid-1950s, sometime between the ages of 16 and 18.

He was elected to the Wisconsin State Assembly in 1963 and served there until 1969.

U.S. House of Representatives

Tenure
Obey was the longest-serving member of either house of Congress in Wisconsin's history until his record was surpassed by Jim Sensenbrenner. He was also the third longest-serving member of the House at the end of his service, after fellow Democrats John Dingell and John Conyers, both of Michigan.

In Congress, Obey chaired the commission to write the House's Code of Ethics. Among the reforms he instituted was one requiring members of the House to disclose their personal financial dealings so the public would be made aware of any potential conflicts of interest. Obey served as chairman of the House Appropriations Committee from 2007 to 2011; he briefly chaired this committee from 1994 to 1995 and served as its ranking Democrat from 1995 to 2007. He also chaired its Subcommittee on Labor.

Obey was one of the most liberal members of the House; he considers himself a progressive in the tradition of Robert La Follette. Obey had risen to the position of fifth ranking House Democrat since his party retook control of Congress.

His "Obey Amendment" has prohibited the export of the Lockheed Martin F-22 Raptor to American allies such as Japan.

Obey also is remembered for being the congressman who intervened when fellow Democrat Harold Ford, Jr. approached Republican Jean Schmidt on the House floor in 2005. Ford was upset because Schmidt had called Congressman John Murtha a coward for advocating a withdrawal of American forces in Iraq.

Obey holds a critical view of the mainstream American news media, as evidenced by his words on June 13, 2008, upon the sudden death of NBC News Washington Bureau Chief Tim Russert. Obey said of Russert: "Tim Russert's death is not just a body blow for NBC News; it is a body blow for the nation and for anyone who cherishes newsmen and women who have remained devoted to reporting hard news in an era increasingly consumed by trivia." Dave Obey announced an end to his congressional career on May 5, 2010, with press releases being released on May 6.

Education
On June 30, 2010, Obey proposed an amendment to a supplemental war spending bill that would allocate $10 billion to prevent expected teacher layoffs from school districts nationwide. The amendment, which passed the House on July 1, 2010, proposed siphoning off $500 million from the Race to the Top fund as well as $300 million designated for charter schools and teacher incentive pay. In response, the White House released a statement threatening a veto if the bill is passed by the Senate.

Healthcare
On March 21, 2010, Obey swung the same gavel used to pass Medicare in 1965, but this time to pass the Patient Protection and Affordable Care Act.

Political campaigns
Obey was elected to the House to replace eight-term incumbent Republican Melvin R. Laird, who was appointed Secretary of Defense under President Richard Nixon. Obey, only 30 when he was elected, became the youngest member of Congress upon taking his seat, as well as the first Democrat to represent the district in the 20th century. He was elected to a full term in 1970 and was reelected 18 times. He only faced serious opposition twice. In 1972, during his bid for a second full term, his district was merged with the neighboring 10th District of Republican Alvin O'Konski, a 15-term incumbent. However, Obey retained 60 percent of his former territory, and was handily reelected in subsequent contests.

In 1994, Obey only won reelection by eight points as the Democrats lost control of the House during the Republican Revolution.

2008

2010
Obey was expected to run in 2010, having raised a warchest of $1.4 million. However, Obey was facing tough poll numbers in his district, plus his age and the death of close colleague John Murtha and his frustration with the White House convinced him to bow out of the race.

Upon his retirement, the seat was won by Republican Sean Duffy, who defeated Democratic State Senator Julie Lassa.

Books
Foreword to Along Wisconsin’s Ice Age Trail by Eric Sherman and Andrew Hanson III (2008, University of Wisconsin Press) 
Raising Hell for Justice: The Washington Battles of a Heartland Progressive (2008, University of Wisconsin Press)

References

External links
 
Profile at the Democratic Party of Wisconsin
A Hard-Edged Cheesehead and the Power of the Purse, Silla Brush, U.S. News & World Report, July 8, 2007
BBC World News America interview with David Obey on his retirement

|-

|-

|-

1938 births
21st-century American politicians
Democratic Party members of the United States House of Representatives from Wisconsin
Living people
Democratic Party members of the Wisconsin State Assembly
People from Okmulgee, Oklahoma
Politicians from Wausau, Wisconsin
University of Wisconsin–Madison College of Letters and Science alumni
Writers from Wisconsin